"Turtles All the Way Down" is a song written and recorded by American country music artist Sturgill Simpson. It was released in April 2014 as the second single from his album Metamodern Sounds in Country Music.

Content
The song title, also in the lyrics, is a reference to "turtles all the way down", a lighthearted term for the concept of Anavastha from Indian philosophy, which states that there is no underlying basis, or ground, for existence. The song lyrics are about, in part, the psychedelic experience as brought on by drugs including marijuana, LSD, psilocybin and DMT. References are made to encounters with Jesus, the Devil, the Buddha, and reptile aliens. The songwriter's mortality, and the life saving effect of love, are also referenced. The musical form is that of a country music ballad. The verse melody and instrumental accompaniment are an interpolation of the verse of the Kris Kristofferson song "Me and Bobbie McGee" as performed by Waylon Jennings in the early 1970s.

Critical reception
In his review of the album, Thom Jurek gave the song a positive review, praising both the production as well as Simpson's vocals and saying that "The track features Cobb's nylon-string guitar, the wafting tapes of a Mellotron, electric bass, acoustic and electric guitars, and sharp drums framing Simpson's lyrics that refer to Jesus, the Old Testament, Buddha, mythology, cosmology, drugs, and physics, before concluding that "love's the only thing that ever saved my life," making it a glorious cosmic cowboy song.

Rolling Stone ranked the song No. 4 in its article "25 Best Country Songs of 2014." It praised the lyrics, saying that ""Turtles All the Way Down" is many things. Part twisted travelogue ("Met the devil in Seattle and spent nine months inside the lion's den"), part half-baked philosophy seminar ("Our souls must roam to and through that myth we call space and time"), "Turtles" serves as Simpson's grand mission statement for the rich storytelling and sentimentality that define this promising new artist."

Music video
The music video was directed by Graham Uhelski and premiered in April 2014.

In television
The song was featured on FX's The Bridge.

The song was featured on HBO’s Watchmen in the season 1 episode “Little Fear Of Lightning.”

This song was featured in Yellowstone on Paramount 

The song was played at the closing scene of Reservation Dogs, season 2 episode 8.

References

2014 songs
Sturgill Simpson songs
2014 singles
Psychedelic songs
Song recordings produced by Dave Cobb
Songs about drugs
Songs critical of religion